Tangoio is a farming locality and beach 23 kilometres north of Napier, 7 kilometres north of Whirinaki and 7 kilometres south-west of Waipatiki Beach in the Hawke's Bay Region of New Zealand's North Island. The locality is on the flat along Te Ngarue Stream and State Highway 2. It is part of Hastings District. Tangoio has been the official name since it replaced Tongoio in 1930. Near Tangoio Beach is Whakaari Headland, the site of a whaling station in the 1840s and a Maori canoe landing reserve.

Marae

Tangoio Marae is a meeting place for Maungaharuru Tangitū, a collective of Māori hapū (subtribes) of the Ngāti Kahungunu iwi, consisting of Marangatūhetaua (also known as Ngāti Tū), Ngāi Tauira, Ngāi Te Ruruku ki Tangoio, Ngāi Tahu, Ngāti Kurumōkihi (formerly known as Ngāi Tatara) and Ngāti Whakaari. Pūnanga Te Wao is the name of the meeting house. In October 2020, the Government committed $6,020,910 from the Provincial Growth Fund to upgrade it and 18 other Hawke's Bay marae, creating 39 jobs.

References

Hastings District
Beaches of the Hawke's Bay Region
Populated places in the Hawke's Bay Region
Populated places around Hawke Bay